Ofira Henig (born March 1960) is an Israeli theater director. She has served as the artistic director of Jerusalem's Khan Theatre, the Israel Festival, The Laboratory in Jerusalem, and the Herzliya Theater Ensemble.

Biography 
Born in 1960 on Kibbutz Ruhama, Israel, Ofira Henig was the third child of the administrator Nathan (Nånoor) Hönig (born 1929 in Czechoslovakia) and rhythmics teacher Bessie née Schauffer (born 1928 in Lithuania). Her parents had immigrated to Palestine from Switzerland in 1945. In 1962, the family moved to Holon. Henig attended Mitrani Municipal High School. After military service from 1979 to 1981, she studied drama at the Kibbutz College in Tel Aviv, graduating in 1986. 

Her first directing projects included Peter Schaffer's Equus (1989) and Martin Sherman's Bent (1990), both of which premiered at Beit Zvi in Ramat Gan.

From 1991 to 1993, she worked as a director for Habima Theatre in Tel Aviv. In 1995, she became the artistic director of Jerusalem's Khan Theatre. She later served as the director of the Israel Festival. In 2002, she was appointed the artistic director of theater and dance for the Jerusalem International Festival, and in 2004 she took on the artistic direction of The Laboratory, a new experimental theater in Jerusalem. In 2008, she became the leader of the Herzliya Theater Ensemble. 

In 2006, she staged In Spitting Distance, a one-man show written by Taher Najib and starring Khalifa Natour. The piece garnered international recognition. The play toured the world, performing at the Sydney Opera House, the Deutsches Theater in Berlin, and the Barbican Centre in London. 

Her 2016 work Manmaro features Khalifa Natour and deals with the experiences of Syrian refugees.

Since October 2015, she is Head of Directing Department at Faculty of the Arts, Tel-Aviv University, Associate Professor.

Selected works 
 Director
 2016: Manmaro at the Schaubühne Berlin (starring Khalifa Natour) 
 2012: Ulysses on Bottles by Gilad Evron, Haifa Theatre
 2008: In Spitting Distance by Taher Najib, monologue in Arabic, Sydney Opera House, Australia (starring Khalifa Natour)
 2005:  Salomé by Oscar Wilde
 2002: The Screens by Jean Genet, Habima, Tel Aviv
 2001: Le Retour au désert by Bernard-Marie Koltès, Khan Theatre, Jerusalem
 1997: Yvonne, princesse de Bourgogne by Witold Gombrowicz, Khan Theatre, Jerusalem
 1993:   Hippolytus by Euripides, Habima, Tel Aviv
 1993:  Creditors by August Strindberg, Habima, Tel Aviv
 1992:  The Lower Depths by Maxim Gorki, Habima, Tel Aviv
 1991:  The Glass Menagerie de Tennessee Williams, Habima, Tel Aviv
 1990: Bent by Martin Sherman, Beit Zvi, Ramat Gan
 1989: Equus by Peter Shaffer, Beit Zvi, Ramat Gan

Awards 
 2006 Best Performance at TheaterNETTO In Spitting Distance
 2004 Israel Theater Prize
 2000 Director of the Year for Back to the Desert

References

External links 
 Artist website
 Bio on Deutsches Theater website

1960 births
Israeli theatre directors
Women theatre directors
Israeli artists
Living people